The Rabanser Case is a 1950 West German crime film directed by Kurt Hoffmann and starring Hans Söhnker, Richard Häussler, and Carola Höhn. A journalist comes under suspicion of murder.

The film's sets were designed by the art director Franz Schroedter. It was shot at the Bendestorf Studios outside Hamburg.

Cast

References

Bibliography

External links 
 

1950 films
1950 crime films
German crime films
West German films
1950s German-language films
Films directed by Kurt Hoffmann
Films shot in Hamburg
German black-and-white films
1950s German films